"Ride" is an original song performed by ZZ Ward featuring Gary Clark Jr. for the Disney/Pixar film Cars 3 and its soundtrack. The song, which plays during the film's end credits, was written by Ward, Evan Bogart and Dave Bassett, with the latter also producing, mixing, and recording it. It was released as a single  on April 14, 2017.

History
The song was first announced on May 18, 2017, along with the soundtrack and Randy Newman's original score. Ward first performed the song on Dancing with the Stars on April 17, 2017. She later included the song as the last track of The Storm, her second studio album, which was released on June 30, 2017.
The song is an up-tempo pop-dance song.

Music video
A music video of the song, featuring footage of the film, was released on June 16, 2017, the same day on which the film, the soundtrack and  score were released.

References

2017 singles
Walt Disney Records singles
2017 songs
Songs written for animated films
Songs about cars
Songs written by Dave Bassett (songwriter)
Songs written by E. Kidd Bogart
2010s ballads